The 2015 Moscow Sevens was the opening tournament of the 2015 Sevens Grand Prix Series. It was held over the weekend of 6–7 June 2015.

Teams
The 12 participating teams for the tournament:

Pool Stage

Pool A

Pool B

Pool C

Knockout stage

Bowl

Plate

Cup

2015
2015 in Russian rugby union
Grand Prix 1